Terminate Damnation is the debut album by Christian progressive death metal band Becoming the Archetype, released on August 30, 2005. The title of the album was taken from the song "Terminate Damnation" from the Mortification album, Scrolls of the Megilloth.

The album artwork was painted by Dan Seagrave, who has been commissioned to draw many metal album covers.

Terminate Damnation was released on vinyl with a limited pressing of 500 by Broken Circles Records in 2011.

Track listing
 "March of the Dead" – 1:42
 "Into Oblivion" – 6:01
 "One Man Parade" – 4:51
 "Elegy: Deception/Lament/Triumph" – 11:14 (featuring Ryan Clark of Demon Hunter)
 "Night's Sorrow" – 3:51
 "The Epigone" – 5:00
 "Beyond Adaptation" – 2:34
 "No Fall Too Far" – 5:46
 "Ex Nihilo" – 5:08
 "Denouement" – 1:44
 "The Trivial Paroxysm" – 6:37

Personnel
BTA
 Jason Wisdom – vocals, bass guitar
 Jon Star – guitars, engineering
 Sean Cunningham – guitars
 Seth Hecox – guitars, keyboards
 Brent Duckett – drums

Additional musicians
 Ryan Clark – vocals on "Elegy", A&R

Production
 Zach Hodges – producer, engineering, drum recording
 Troy Glessner – drum recording
 Jeff Gros – photography
 Jonathan Dunn – A&R
 Aaron Mlasko – drum tech
 Dan Seagrave – cover art
 Tue Madsen – mixing, mastering

References and notes

Becoming the Archetype albums
2005 debut albums
Tooth & Nail Records albums
Albums with cover art by Dan Seagrave
Solid State Records albums